Pristerognathus is an extinct genus of therocephalian, known from the late Middle Permian (Capitanian) of South Africa. It lends its name to the Pristerognathus Assemblage Zone of the Beaufort Group of South African geological strata.

These animals were roughly dog-sized, and are characterized by long, narrow skulls with large canines. They are likely to have lived in woodlands, and preyed on smaller therapsids and millerettids of the time.

Pristerognathus was described in 1895 by Harry Seeley who named the type species Pristerognathus polyodon. Many other species were named in the years following, such as P. baini, P. minor, and P. vanderbyli, however, they have all since been recognised as referable to other species (such as Glanosuchus and Pristerognathoides) are too dubious to determine. As such, P. polyodon is the only definitive species of Pristerognathus.

See also
 List of therapsids

References

Guadalupian synapsids
Scylacosaurids
Guadalupian synapsids of Africa
Fossil taxa described in 1895
Taxa named by Harry Seeley
Guadalupian genus first appearances
Guadalupian genus extinctions